Cyprien Mbonimpa (born December 26, 1946) is a Burundian diplomat. He was his country's ambassador to Belgium (1980–85) and France (1985–87) and served as minister of foreign affairs in 1987–92.

1946 births
Living people
Foreign ministers of Burundi
Ambassadors of Burundi to France
Ambassadors of Burundi to Belgium
Place of birth missing (living people)
20th-century Burundian people